This is a list of the first minority male lawyer(s) and judge(s) in Nebraska. It includes the year in which the men were admitted to practice law (in parentheses). Also included are men who achieved other distinctions such becoming the first in their state to graduate from law school or become a political figure.

Firsts in state history

Lawyers 

 First African American: Silas Robbins (1889) 
 First Native American (Omaha people) male: Hiram Chase (1889)  
 First Native American (Omaha people) male to argue a case before the U.S. Supreme Court: Thomas L. Sloan (1892) in 1904
 First Jewish American male: Simeon Bloom

State judges 

 First African American male (district court): Marlon Polk in 2005

Firsts in local history 
 Marlon Polk: First African American male to become a Judge of the Fourth Judicial District Court in Nebraska (2005) [Douglas County, Nebraska]

See also 

 List of first minority male lawyers and judges in the United States

Other topics of interest 

 List of first women lawyers and judges in the United States
 List of first women lawyers and judges in Nebraska

References 

 
Minority, Nebraska, first
Minority, Nebraska, first
Legal history of Nebraska
Lists of people from Nebraska
Nebraska lawyers